Tropical Storm Amanda and Tropical Storm Cristobal were two related, consecutive tropical storms that affected Central America, southern Mexico, the central United States, and Canada in late May and early June 2020. The first tropical cyclone formed in the East Pacific and was named Amanda. After crossing Central America, it regenerated into a second one in the Gulf of Mexico and was named Cristobal. Amanda was the second tropical depression and the first named storm of the 2020 Pacific hurricane season, and Cristobal was the third named storm of the extremely active 2020 Atlantic hurricane season, and the earliest third named storm in the North Atlantic Ocean on record. Cristobal's regeneration date in the North Atlantic eclipsed the date set by Tropical Storm Colin in 2016, which formed on June 5. It was also the first Atlantic tropical storm formed in the month of June since Cindy in 2017, and the first June tropical cyclone to make landfall in Mexico since Danielle in 2016.

Amanda developed out of a broad area of low pressure associated with a tropical wave, which moved off the coast of Nicaragua into the Pacific on May 29. The disturbance slowly developed a more well-defined circulation, and on May 30, the system was designated as Tropical Depression Two-E after finishing tropical cyclogenesis. Originally expected not to strengthen significantly, the storm nevertheless compacted and was upgraded to Tropical Storm Amanda at 09:00 UTC the next day. Three hours later, Amanda made landfall in southeast Guatemala. Once inland, Amanda rapidly weakened and degenerated into a remnant low over the region's rough terrain. However, the system's remnants survived, crossing Central America and Mexico.

On June 1, the system regenerated into Tropical Storm Cristobal over the Bay of Campeche. The storm slowly curved northward over Mexico and moved over the Gulf of Mexico, making a second landfall over southeastern Louisiana at 22:10 UTC on June 7. The system progressed north through the Mississippi Valley, managing to survive over land as a tropical depression, before finally becoming extratropical over southern Wisconsin at 03:00 UTC on June 10. Cristobal's extratropical remnant then moved north past Lake Superior and then over James Bay, before dissipating on June 12. The remnant moisture was subsequently absorbed into another system, which headed northeastward towards the Labrador Sea.

Tropical Storm Amanda produced torrential rainfall across Guatemala and severely impacted El Salvador, causing the worst natural disaster in the country since Hurricane Mitch in 1998; rivers overflowed and swept away buildings, damaging 900 homes and displacing over 1,200 people. Heavy rains also caused minor to moderate flooding in Mexico and Belize. Five people were killed in Honduras. Overall, Amanda resulted in an estimated $200 million in damage and killed 40 people in three countries. Combined with Amanda, Cristobal led to nearly a week of devastating rainfall across Guatemala, El Salvador, and southern Mexico. Over 230,000 acres of crops were damaged in the Mexican state of Yucatán, leading to a damage estimate of US$184 million in Mexico. In the United States, Cristobal spawned multiple tornadoes and waterspouts along the Gulf Coast and the Midwest. Altogether, Cristobal caused at least US$665 million in damage and 6 fatalities. Throughout their entire lifespan, the cyclones killed 46 people and caused $865 million (2020 USD) in damages.

Meteorological history

On May 24, the NHC first discussed the possibility of tropical cyclogenesis in the East Pacific basin, due to a broad area of low pressure that was forecast to form off the coast of El Salvador with an associated tropical wave. Furthermore, several other factors were favorable during the formation of Amanda, most notably a Kelvin wave traversing east over the far eastern portion of the basin and a mid-to-upper-level low forming off the coast of Mexico, both of which were enhanced large-scale convective activity. A tropical wave moved off the west coast of Africa on May 18–19, and tracked generally westward across the Atlantic basin for several days, crossing over Panama and entering the Eastern Pacific basin on May 29. As the tropical wave emerged into the Pacific, it caused the pre-existing disturbance that was being enhanced by a Central American Gyre (CAG) to become more organized.

By May 30, the system attained a closed and defined low-level circulation and was considered sufficiently organized enough to be designated as Tropical Depression Two-E later that same day, remaining embedded within the eastern side of a Central American Gyre. The depression shifted northeastward than north-northeastward as it remained entrained into the larger gyre's circulation. The system's satellite appearance improved, and the depression further strengthened to tropical storm strength and was named Amanda at 06:00 UTC on May 31. Amanda improved further in organization up to landfall at 10:00 UTC that day, near Las Lisas, Guatemala. Once inland, Amanda brought torrential rainfall to portions of Guatemala and El Salvador that produced flooding and landslides. Amanda's appearance quickly deteriorated over land due to the mountainous landscape, and its low-level circulation center dissipated at 18:00 UTC on May 31. However, Amanda's remnant low survived the land interaction and continued to move north-northwestward for another day, steered by the Central American Gyre.

On June 1, as the system moved northward toward the Yucatán Peninsula, the National Hurricane Center (NHC) advised that in all likelihood, Amanda's remnants would develop into an Atlantic tropical depression within the next few days. For the next four days, the depression proceeded to make a slow counterclockwise loop over the region. Located over the Bay of Campeche, the depression proceeded to slowly intensify throughout the rest of the day. On the morning of June 2, a U.S. Air Force Reserve hurricane hunter aircraft investigated the depression and found the system to be very close to tropical storm strength, and data from a subsequent midday flight indicated that wind speeds had increased to tropical storm-force, so the cyclone was given the name Cristobal. Because it had degenerated into a remnant low in the East Pacific basin before regenerating in the North Atlantic basin, the system was given a new name from the North Atlantic naming list, according to the NHC's policy on cross-basin storms. This marked the earliest third named storm in the Atlantic, eclipsing the record set by Tropical Storm Colin in 2016, which formed on June 5.

Cristobal strengthened as it stayed nearly stationary in the Bay of Campeche on the next day. The storm's development was reinforced by the moisture and the persistent onshore flow across parts of Central America, steered by a large counter-clockwise wind pattern known as the Central American Gyre. Afterward the storm began slowly moving southward while gaining strength quickly, as it neared the Mexican coastline. Cristobal became more symmetrical, and its barometric pressure continued dropping. Cristobal, beginning to lose its convective activity, began to slowly weaken as the day went on while it pushed further southeast into the Mexican state of Campeche.

At 16:00 UTC on June 4, Cristobal was downgraded to tropical depression status, with its satellite appearance continuously degrading. The depression lost most of its banding features due to prolonged interaction with land, and most of its convection was limited to the northeastern quadrant of the circulation. Then, while near the northwestern tip of Guatemala, Cristobal made a cyclonic loop, as it was still embedded within the Central American Gyre, and the cyclone moved back across the Yucatán Peninsula before turning northward. During this time, the storm also started becoming better-organized on satellite imagery. At 09:00 UTC on June 5, Cristobal reintensified into a tropical storm, even though it was still situated over land.

Cristobal exited the Yucatán on June 5 and entered the southern Gulf of Mexico. The much-broader cyclone moved further north as dry air and interaction with an upper-level trough to the east began to strip Cristobal of its central convection, with most of the convection being displaced to the east and north of the center, and thoroughly ridding Cristobal of a typical tropical cyclone structure. Reconnaissance aircraft found Cristobal slightly stronger on the afternoon of June 6, despite being poorly-organized. Observations from the NHC suggested that Cristobal resembled a subtropical cyclone rather than a tropical cyclone during this period, with the strongest winds and convection displaced well to the east of the center; however, the agency still classified Cristobal as a tropical storm.

After landfall, a blocking high-pressure area to the east caused Cristobal to turn to the northwest and slow down. The weakening storm moved directly over the New Orleans metropolitan area and clipped the southwest corner of Mississippi before dropping to tropical depression status by 12:00 UTC on June 8 while centered near the Louisiana-Mississippi border. The blocking high was then pushed eastward by advancing deep-layer trough over the Rocky Mountains, and Cristobal accelerated northward along the Mississippi Valley, passing over Arkansas, Missouri, Illinois, and Iowa. Six hours later, Cristobal became extratropical at 00:00 UTC on June 10, while situated over northeastern Iowa, the farthest northwest a fully-tropical system had traveled over North America in recorded history. The storm was only the fourth tropical cyclone remnant on record to have moved over Wisconsin, and the first since Gilbert in 1988.

Cristobal reached the Upper Peninsula of Michigan as a post-tropical cyclone by the early morning hours of June 10, and the last public advisory issued by the Weather Prediction Center on Cristobal came later that morning, at 09:00 UTC. Multiple June low pressure records fell as Cristobal passed through the Marquette area. In doing so, Cristobal became the first known case of a tropical system reaching Lake Superior. Cristobal's remnant moisture was subsequently absorbed into another neighboring frontal system, which crossed over Labrador later that day.

Preparations

Amanda

Guatemala and El Salvador

On the first advisory for Tropical Depression Two-E, the government of Guatemala issued a Tropical Storm warning for the entire coastline of Guatemala, from the Guatemala–Mexico border eastward to the El Salvador–Guatemala border. A tropical storm warning was also issued for the coast of El Salvador. In Guatemala, nearly 1,500 shelters were opened for those affected by the storm.

Cristobal

Mexico
In expectation of high winds and heavy downpours, a tropical storm warning spanning from Campeche westward to Veracruz was issued by the government of Mexico on June 1 as Tropical Depression Three was forecasted to strengthen in the Bay of Campeche. A total of 9,000 Mexican soldiers and National Guard members were sent to assist with preparations and relief work. Residents in several at-risk communities in the states of Tabasco, Campeche and Veracruz were evacuated on June 2. On June 5, while Cristobal was downgraded to a tropical depression, a tropical storm watch was issued extending from Punta Herrero to Río Lagartos by the Mexican government. This watch was upgraded to a warning six hours later.

United States
With Cristobal tracking toward the state, Louisiana governor John Bel Edwards declared a state of emergency on June 4 and ordered evacuations for low-lying coastal areas. On June 5, a tropical storm watch was issued from Intracoastal City, Louisiana, to the Alabama-Florida border. A storm surge watch was also issued for parts of Louisiana, Mississippi, Alabama, and Florida. The town of Grand Isle, Louisiana, issued a mandatory evacuation order starting on June 6 at 11:00 UTC, according to Grand Isle Mayor David Camardelle. Later that day, Amtrak cancelled all trains throughout the area. U.S. President Donald Trump declared a federal state of emergency in Louisiana on June 7 as Cristobal approached landfall. Additionally, flash flood and river flood watches were issued from Louisiana in the south to Wisconsin in the north due to rainfall estimates upward of  forecast in some areas, impacting more than 15 million people.

Impacts

Mexico and Central America
The combined effects of Tropical storms Amanda and Cristobal brought torrential rains to a large swath of Central America and Mexico. According to the National Hurricane Center, parts of the Pacific coasts of El Salvador, Guatemala, and Mexico's Chiapas state picked up  of rainfall.

Guatemala
On May 31, Amanda made landfall in Guatemala, only the second tropical cyclone to make landfall on that nation's Pacific coast this century. The last storm to do so was Tropical Storm Agatha in 2010. Amanda brought torrential rainfall to portions of Guatemala that produced flooding and landslides. Two people died across the country.

El Salvador

In El Salvador, torrential rainfall caused significant damage along coastal cities in the country as rivers overflowed and swept away buildings. 25% of the country's annual rainfall totals fell in just 70 hours due to Amanda. Rainfall reached  in Izalco by the morning of May 31, prior to Amanda's landfall. Amanda killed 30 people in El Salvador, of which at least six died due to flash flooding, and one died from a collapsed home. More than 900 homes were damaged across the country and 1,200 families were evacuated to 51 shelters across La Libertad, San Salvador, Sonsonate, and San Vicente. In the capital, San Salvador, 50 houses were destroyed and 23 vehicles fell into a sinkhole. El Salvador President Nayib Bukele declared a 15-day national state of emergency due to the storm. Movement restrictions in place for the ongoing COVID-19 pandemic were temporarily lifted to allow people to purchase medicines, while hardware stores were allowed to open with limited capacity so people could purchase equipment for repairs. Around 7,225 people lost their homes and had to be sent to 154 shelters around the country. At least 2,800 hectares of crops were damaged or lost in the country. Additionally, around 30,000 structures were damaged or likely destroyed by flooding and mudslides. Amanda was considered the worst weather disaster to effect El Salvador in 22 years since Hurricane Mitch, in which Amanda caused rainfall accumulations of at least  in many parts of the country and Mitch only caused at least  in other areas in a longer period of time. Around 336,000 Salvadorans were pushed into severe food insecurity in both rural and urban areas.

ACT Alliance promised at least US$75,000 worth of food and other emergency supplies to be supplied to 1,450 households across the country. Damage was estimated at US$200 million (1.75 billion colón).

Honduras
Despite being located relatively far away from where Amanda made landfall, five people died in Honduras due to the storm, including a brother and sister whose car was swept away by a current in Tegucigalpa. Heavy flooding affected the Valle Department in the west of the country.

Mexico
The National Meteorological Service of Mexico reported that  of rain fell in Ocotepec, Chiapas between May 30 and June 3. Mérida, the capital of Yucatán, recorded  in the same time frame. The widespread rainfall led to some significant flooding across the Yucatán Peninsula. Some areas of Yucatán received a year's-worth of rain in four days. Cristobal also caused minor damage to a PEMEX oil platform in the Gulf of Mexico and to the terminal at Isla del Carmen (near where it made landfall).

At least 619 people had to be evacuated, due to the threat of incoming landslides and flash flooding. Additionally, 16 individual landslides were reported across Campeche, Chiapas, and Yucatán. Around 10,000 people were estimated to have been severely affected by flash flooding. Agricultural damage in Campeche reached 40 million pesos (US$1.84 million). One person drowned while trying to swim through  floodwaters in Santa María, Yaxcabá. Another person died in Chiapas when a tree fell on him.

In Yucatán,  of crops were damaged, which is about 85% of the total crops statewide. The costs were calculated at 4 billion pesos (US$184 million). Further east, in Lázaro Cárdenas, Quintana Roo, the heavy rain from Cristobal caused flooding and damaged  of papaya. Total losses were estimated at 1 million pesos (US$46,000).

United States

Ahead of the storm's landfall, two children died in Louisiana after being pulled to sea by a rip current, and a third drowned in Texas due to the rough surf. A  storm surge caused flooding along much of the Louisiana coast, and flooded the only road leading to and out of Grand Isle, which was under a mandatory evacuation. Torrential rainfall and the storm surge caused a flood event in Grand Isle said to have been the worst since Hurricane Isaac in 2012. A large portion of Louisiana Highway 1 was completely flooded and inaccessible throughout June 7, and around 4,000 power outages occurred across New Orleans on that same day. Infrastructural damage to southern Louisiana incurred a damage estimate near US$150 million.

In Florida, several tornado warnings were issued and at least six tornadoes were confirmed in the state between June 6 and 7 from Cristobal's outer rainbands. A destructive EF1 tornado struck areas just east of Downtown Orlando, starting as a waterspout over Lake Conway before moving ashore and damaging or uprooting multiple trees, some of which fell onto homes. The tornado caused about $956,000 of property damage.

In Mississippi near where Cristobal made landfall, several weather observation sites reported strong tropical storm-force winds. Flooding became severe over Mississippi following Cristobal's landfall, and a state of emergency was declared by Mississippi governor Tate Reeves on June 10 to help speed up relief efforts; preliminary damage estimates in the state reached US$5.2 million.

Downgraded to a tropical depression, Cristobal merged with another storm system coming from the west, bringing torrential rainfall and gusty winds across the Midwestern states. The system brought stormy weather to the Great Lakes Region, accompanied by strong winds and high waves along the north end of Green Bay, especially across Big Bay de Noc in Michigan's Upper Peninsula. Data retrieved at 06:00 UTC on June 10 from the GPM satellite found the heaviest rainfall occurring in two areas: north and west of Lake Superior, north of Rossport and Red Rock, Ontario, Canada; and over Georgian Bay on the eastern side of Lake Huron. The storm became the wettest tropical storm on record in Minnesota.

The large volume of moisture dragged behind Post-Tropical Cyclone Cristobal as it moved to the north prompted a rare moderate risk of severe thunderstorms to be issued for large portions of Michigan, Indiana and Ohio by the Storm Prediction Center in their categorical outlook. A squall line associated with Cristobal's remnants, later classified as a derecho, brought wind gusts up to  around the areas; 650,000 people lost power due to the derecho from Indiana and Michigan to western New York. The derecho produced three EF0 tornadoes in Ohio as well as a high-end EF1 tornado in Beaver County, Pennsylvania on June 10, the later of which snapped dozens of trees and several power poles.

Canada
The same thunderstorm line also impacted Southern Ontario and Western Quebec. More than 43,000 households lost electrical power in Ontario. In Quebec, the winds resulted in over 130,000 households losing power, about half of which were located in the Greater Montreal Area.

Fierce winds and torrential rain accompanied by hail stormed through the District of Muskoka, causing extensive damage. EF1 tornadoes also touched down near Bracebridge and Baysville, as did an EF2 tornado near Mary Lake. Two additional tornadoes struck the London area: an EF0 tornado in Glencoe and an EF1 tornado in Belmont.

See also

 Weather of 2020
 Tropical cyclones in 2020
 Other storms with the name Amanda
 Other storms with the name Cristobal
 List of derecho events
 Tornadoes of 2020
 Hurricane Isidore (2002) – A storm that took a similar track from the Yucatán to the Louisiana coast.
 Tropical Storm Alma (2008) – Also impacted El Salvador
 Tropical Storm Arthur (2008) – Was a regeneration of Tropical Storm Alma; also impacted the same areas in Central America
 Tropical Storm Agatha (2010) – Caused catastrophic flooding in Central America, particularly Guatemala
 Tropical Storm Hermine (2010) – Atlantic tropical storm that formed from the remnants of Eastern Pacific Tropical Depression Eleven-E
 Tropical Storm Selma (2017) – Also impacted El Salvador and Guatemala
 Hurricane Delta (2020) – Affected the Yucatán as well as Louisiana later in the season
 Tropical Storm Claudette (2021) – A storm that took a similar track and affected Louisiana around the same time a year later.
 Hurricane Grace (2021) – A storm which crossed over Mexico and had its remnants form Tropical Storm Marty (2021)

Notes

References

External links 

 The NHC's advisory archive on Tropical Storm Amanda (2020)
 The NHC's advisory archive on Tropical Storm Cristobal (2020)
 , Disaster Compilations.
 , Disaster Compilations.

Cristobal
Cristobal
Tropical cyclones in 2020
Amanda
Amanda
Amanda
Amanda
Amanda
Cristobal
Cristobal
Cristobal
Cristobal
Cristobal
Cristobal
Cristobal
Cristobal
Cristobal
Cristobal